Toxiferine (C-toxiferine I) is a curare toxin.  It is a bisindole alkaloid derived from Strychnos toxifera and a nicotinic acetylcholine receptor antagonist. This alkaloid is the main toxic component of Calabash curare, and one of the most toxic plant alkaloids known. The lethal dose (LD50) for mice has been determined as 10 - 60 µg/kg by intravenous administration.
It is a muscle relaxant that causes paralysis of skeletal muscle, which takes approximately 2 hours to recovery for a moderate dose, and 8 hours of total paralysis with a 20-fold paralytic dose. The paralysis can be antagonized by neostigmine

References 

Indole alkaloids
Nicotinic antagonists
Quaternary ammonium compounds
Neuromuscular blockers
Neurotoxins
Plant toxins